A sexual norm can refer to a personal or a social norm. Most cultures have social norms regarding sexuality, and define normal sexuality to consist only of certain sex acts between individuals who meet specific criteria of age, consanguinity (e.g. incest), race/ethnicity (e.g. miscegenation), and/or social role and socioeconomic status.

In most societies, the term normal identifies a range or spectrum of behaviors. Rather than each act being simply classified as "acceptable" or "not acceptable", many acts are viewed as "more or less accepted" by different people, and the opinion on how normal or acceptable they are greatly depends on the individual making the opinion as well as the culture itself. Based on information gained from sexological studies, a great many ordinary people's sex lives are very often quite different from popular beliefs about normal, in private.

If non-restrictive sexual norms are regarded positively, they may be called "sexual freedom", "sexual liberation" or "free love". If they are regarded negatively, they may be called "sexual licence" or "licentiousness". Restrictive social norms, if judged negatively, are called sexual oppression.  If the restrictive norms are judged positively, they may be regarded as encouraging chastity, "sexual self-restraint" or "sexual decency", and negative terms are used for the targeted sexuality, e.g. sexual abuse and perversion.

Social attitudes

In the West, some people have relaxed the traditional definitions of normality, choosing instead to define normal sexuality as any sexual practice which does not involve what are regarded as sexual perversions. However, using this definition makes use of a long list of sexual perversions which themselves show up hidden assumptions about cultural norms. Recently, in Western society, consensual paraphilias are becoming more acceptable, in particular "any activity, not otherwise illegal, performed between consenting adults in private."

This liberalization of attitudes has resulted in the legalization of homosexuality in many countries, following the ground-breaking Wolfenden report in the UK.

There is a tendency in Western countries towards serial monogamy as a normal heterosexual lifestyle.  There is also a movement towards recognizing long-term homosexual relationships (see same-sex marriage).

There is also greater acceptance of sexual relationships (partnerships) without requiring the sanction of a form of marriage recognised by the church, state or legal system.

These liberalizing trends can be contrasted with conservative social trends that seek to reverse these patterns of behaviour, with encouragement for young people to choose traditionally accepted roles, beliefs and behaviors, and to exercise sexual abstinence or non-promiscuous lifestyles before marriage.

There is an opposing trend in reaction, that views such changes as a socially destructive force, and is opposed to them. It is often, though not exclusively, associated with people who have religious feelings, and is prevalent in much of Christianity in America, as well as Islam in the Middle East and Asia, and other devout religious groups such as Haredi Jews in Israel.  In such countries there is often strong criticism of non-traditional sexualities and sexual liberation.

Some social unrest in both Eastern and Western cultures is due to this conflict between these two trends, and views upon acceptability and control of social and sexual norms.

See also 
 Catholic teachings on sexual morality
 Religion and sexuality
 Reproductive rights
 Same-sex marriage
 Sex and the law
 Sex-positive feminism
 Sex-positive movement

References

External links

Sexual Freedom Why It Is Feared
Lil Wayne and Baby Sitting in a Tree
Factors of Sexual Freedom among Hunter-Gatherers in Cross-Cultural Perspective

Sexuality and society
History of human sexuality
Sociological terminology